Petr Pavlík (born 17 July 1978) is a Czech football player who was once captain of FK Baumit Jablonec. He is currently playing for amateur club Meteor Prague.

References

External links
 
 
 Guardian Football

1978 births
Living people
Czech footballers
Czech First League players
FC Zbrojovka Brno players
1. FC Slovácko players
FK Jablonec players
Association football defenders
Sportspeople from Opava